Stephen Carlson (born December 12, 1996) is an American football tight end who is currently a free agent. He played college football at Princeton.

Professional career

After going undrafted in the 2019 NFL Draft, Carlson signed with the Cleveland Browns as an undrafted free agent in May 2019. He was waived during final roster cuts and subsequently re-signed to the Browns' practice squad. The Browns signed Carlson to their active roster on November 1, 2019. Carlson's first NFL catch was a touchdown reception from Baker Mayfield in a 21–7 victory over the Pittsburgh Steelers on November 14, 2019.

He scored a two-point conversion in the Browns' match against the Dallas Cowboys on October 4, 2020, when he chased down a blocked kick that the Cowboys had fumbled towards the end zone.

Carlson was given an exclusive-rights free agent tender by the Browns on March 5, 2021. He signed the one-year contract on April 14. The Browns placed Carlson on injured reserve on August 16, 2021.

On June 6, 2022, it was announced that Carlson had recovered from his torn ACL and has worked out for the New York Giants.

References

External links
Cleveland Browns bio
Princeton Tigers bio

1996 births
Living people
American football tight ends
Cleveland Browns players
Players of American football from New York (state)
Princeton Tigers football players
Sportspeople from Jamestown, New York